The Church of Stigmatisation of Saint Francis is a Catholic Church built in the mid-18th century, in the Baroque style, located in Buda, Budapest, in the immediate vicinity of the Batthyány tér square.

History 
During the Turkish occupation of Buda, the Pashtun Magtúl Mustafa Mosque stood here.

The spiritual care of Catholic believers was carried out from the middle of the 17th century by Bosnian Franciscan monks, who remained in the city after 1686. In 1703, the construction of a monastery and church began. The architect was Hans James. The foundation stone of the present church was laid in 1731 and consecrated in 1757 by Károly Zbiskó. Most of the Baroque items that are still visible today (altars, pulpit and benches) were made by the monks' own workshop.

However, according to a decree of Joseph II, Holy Roman Emperor, it had to be handed over in 1785 to the Nursing nuns from Vienna, who transformed the monastery into a hospital.  They continued in the nursing service for "unsupervised patients" until 1950. After that, 69 nurses had to leave for the newly established hospital and nursing home. [2] This facility was operated until 1990. Today, the hospital is run by a Maltese charity known as the Care Home for the Elderly.

The church has been in use since 1989 by the priests of German-speaking Catholics in Budapest.

Architecture
The rich ornamentation of the interior of the church is mainly the work of Franciscan artists from the 18th century.

Gallery

References

External links

Várkerület
Roman Catholic churches in Budapest
Baroque church buildings in Hungary
Roman Catholic churches completed in 1731
Defunct hospitals in Hungary
18th-century Roman Catholic church buildings in Hungary